Mikušnica is a village in Skenderaj, Mitrovica, Kosovo, also known since 1999 as Mikushë.

Geography
The town’s name comes from a word in the Aromanian language, spoken by the Vlachs that historically lived in the area.

Notes

External links
 Location

References

Villages in Skenderaj